Samuel Beauman Hilliard (born February 21, 1994) is an American professional baseball outfielder for the Atlanta Braves of Major League Baseball (MLB). He previously played in MLB for the Colorado Rockies.

Amateur career
Hilliard attended Mansfield High School in Mansfield, Texas. He started his college baseball career at Navarro College before transferring to Crowder College. He was drafted by the Minnesota Twins in the 31st round of the 2014 Major League Baseball draft out of Crowder, but did not sign and attended Wichita State University. Hilliard was both an outfielder and pitcher in college. After one year at Wichita State, he was drafted by the Colorado Rockies in the 15th round of the 2015 MLB draft and signed.

Professional career

Colorado Rockies
Hilliard made his professional debut with the Grand Junction Rockies and spent 2016 with the Asheville Tourists, 2017 with the Lancaster JetHawks and 2018 with the Hartford Yard Goats. After the 2018 season, he played in the Arizona Fall League. The Rockies added him to their 40-man roster after the 2018 season.
He began 2019 with the Albuquerque Isotopes.

On August 27, 2019, the Rockies promoted Hilliard to the major leagues. He made his debut that night versus Boston Red Sox and recorded his first major league hit, a two-run home run off Josh Smith. 

In the pandemic shortened 2020 season, Hilliard hit .210/.272/.438 with an unsightly 36.8% strikeout percentage before being optioned down to the Rockies' alternate site after the club acquired Kevin Pillar.

Atlanta Braves
On November 6, 2022, Hilliard was traded to the Atlanta Braves in exchange for Dylan Spain.

Personal life
Sam Hilliard is the youngest of three sons. Hillard's mother, Tamara Hext, was Miss Texas in 1984 and 4th runner-up in the Miss America Pageant that same year. His father, Jim Hilliard, played for the Texas Longhorns football team and was an orthopedic surgeon for 35 years. In March 2018, Jim Hilliard was diagnosed with amyotrophic lateral sclerosis.

References

External links

1994 births
Living people
People from Mansfield, Texas
Baseball players from Texas
Major League Baseball outfielders
Colorado Rockies players
Navarro Bulldogs baseball players
Crowder Roughriders baseball players
Wichita State Shockers baseball players
Grand Junction Rockies players
Asheville Tourists players
Lancaster JetHawks players
Hartford Yard Goats players
Albuquerque Isotopes players
Salt River Rafters players